Maria Charlotta "Charlotte" Norberg also known as Charlotte Törner (27 December 1824 in Stockholm – 25 February 1892 in Stockholm) was a Swedish Ballerina and ballet teacher.  She was a star of the Royal Swedish Ballet in the mid 19th-century.

Life

Charlotte Norberg was born in Stockholm.

In 1833, she was enrolled in the Royal Swedish Ballet at the Royal Swedish Opera as the student of Sophie Daguin at the age of nine. She made her debut as a solo dancer in 1834.   In 1842, she made a success in the pantomime ballet Max och Emma by Sophie Daguin with music by A. F. Schwartz, and in La fille mal gardée by Jean Dauberval.

In 1846–47, she made a study trip to take lessons by August Bournonville in the Royal Danish Ballet in Copenhagen.  Upon her return to Stockholm in 1847, she was appointed premier dancer (ballerina), a position she kept for the duration of her career.  During the mid 19th-century, Charlotte Norberg belonged to the stars of the Royal Swedish Ballet and "during the late 1840s and the entire 1850s, she was very celebrated within the art of dance among the Stockholm audience."   She was regarded as a prominent representative of the Bournonville School and, alongside Johanna Sundberg, was often requested by August Bournonville during his guest performances in Stockholm. Charlotte Norberg also gave lessons and instructed her own students in the Bournonville technique.

Charlotta Norberg retired after her performance in Pesten i Albano by August Bournonville on 30 November 1859, "after which she retired from active service of the theater, much to soon in the unanimous view of all theater interested people of Stockholm.  During her service as a Premier Dancer, she successfully managed many difficult choreographic tasks with great acclaim and was always seen at stage with great pleasure. One of the most prestigious students of the Bournonville school, she always followed the strict traditions of the school at her own performances as well as in the instruction of the pupils she schooled."

In 1853, she married Gustaf Fredrik Törner (1821-1898), a clerk at the Royal Opera.

References 

 Klas Åke Heed: Ny svensk teaterhistoria. Teater före 1800, Gidlunds förlag (2007) 
 Nordisk familjebok, 1920 
 Nordisk familjebok, 1892 
 Ahnfelt, Arvid, Europas konstnärer, Norrköping 1887, M. W. Wallberg & Comp. Boktryckeri. 

1824 births
1892 deaths
Swedish ballerinas
19th-century Swedish ballet dancers
Royal Swedish Ballet dancers